The 2004 Mountain West Conference men's basketball tournament was played at Pepsi Center in Denver, Colorado from March 10–13, 2004.  Third-seeded Utah defeated UNLV, which lost its third consecutive tournament title game (all by 3 points or less), 73–70 in the championship game to win the Mountain West Conference tournament and the league's NCAA Tournament automatic bid.

This marked the first time in league history the tournament was held in a venue other than Las Vegas' Thomas and Mack Center.

Bracket

Mountain West Conference men's basketball tournament
Tournament
Mountain West Conference men's basketball tournament
Mountain West Conference men's basketball tournament
Basketball competitions in Denver
College sports tournaments in Colorado